The 1997 All-Atlantic Coast Conference football team consists of American football players chosen by various selectors for their All-Atlantic Coast Conference ("ACC") teams for the 1997 college football season. Selectors in 1997 included the Associated Press (AP).

Offensive selections

Wide receivers
 E. G. Green, Florida State (AP-1)
 Torry Holt, NC State (AP-1)
 Peter Warrick, Florida State (AP-2)

Tackles
 Jim Bundren, Clemson (AP-1)
 Tra Thomas, Florida State (AP-1)

Guards
 Lonnie Gilbert, NC State (AP-1)
 Glenn Rountree, Clemson (AP-1)
 Jason Whitaker, Florida State (AP-2)

Centers
 Jeff Saturday, North Carolina (AP-1)
 Kevin Long, Florida State (AP-2)

Tight ends
 Melvin Pearsall, Florida State (AP-1)

Quarterbacks
 Thad Busby, Florida State (AP-1)
 Chris Keldorf, North Carolina (AP-2)

Running backs
 Raymond Priester, Clemson (AP-1)
 Tremayne Stephens, NC State (AP-1)
 Jonathan Linton, North Carolina (AP-2)
 Travis Minor, Florida State (AP-2)

Defensive selections

Defensive linemen
 Antonio Dingle, Virginia (AP-1)
 Greg Ellis, North Carolina (AP-1)
 Vonnie Holliday, North Carolina (AP-1)
 Andre Wadsworth, Florida State (AP-1)
 Greg Spires, Florida State (AP-2)

Linebackers
 Sam Cowart, Florida State (AP-1)
 Kivuusama Mays, North Carolina (AP-1)
 Anthony Simmons, Clemson (AP-1)
 Brian Simmons, North Carolina (AP-2)
 Keith Brooking, Georgia Tech (AP-2)
 Daryl Bush, Florida State (AP-2)

Defensive backs
 Dré Bly, North Carolina (AP-1)
 Samari Rolle, Florida State (AP-1)
 Anthony Poindexter, Virginia (AP-1)
 Robert Williams, North Carolina (AP-1)
 Dexter Jackson, Florida State (AP-2)
 Shevin Smith, Florida State (AP-2)

Special teams

Placekickers
 Sims Lenhardt, Duke (AP-1)
 Sebastian Janikowski, Florida State (AP-2)

Punters
 Rodney Williams, Georgia Tech (AP-1)

Return specialist
 Tony Horne, Clemson (AP-1)

Key
AP = Associated Press

See also
1997 College Football All-America Team

References

All-Atlantic Coast Conference football team
All-Atlantic Coast Conference football teams